Josep Anglada Rius (born 21 June 1959 in Vic) is a Spanish far-right politician from Catalonia. He began his political career in the Spanish nationalist, ultra-Catholic, Francoist-leaning party Fuerza Nueva, effectively assuming the role of Blas Piñar's foremost representative in Catalonia, and is the founder and long-standing president of the party Platform for Catalonia. He was leader of the party till 2014 when he was expelled for "management deficiency".
In 2017 he was sentenced to 2 years of prison for threatening in Twitter an adolescent activist of Arran. In 2018 he was found guilty on a charge for data disclosure and sentenced to 1 year of prison.

References

1959 births
Politicians from Catalonia
Far-right politicians in Spain
Living people
Municipal councillors in the province of Barcelona
People from Vic
Far-right politics in Catalonia
Falangist politicians